James Blackshaw (born 1981) is an English, Hastings-based folk fingerstyle guitarist and pianist. Blackshaw primarily plays an acoustic 12 string guitar and has been compared to Bert Jansch, Robbie Basho, John Fahey, Jack Rose, and Leo Kottke. He has released albums on the labels Celebrate Psi Phenomenon, Barl Fire Recordings, Static Caravan, Digitalis Industries, Important Records, Tompkins Square, and Young God Records.

In April 2016, he announced an indefinite hiatus from recording and performing music. His show in Hastings in August 2016 is his last one prior to hiatus. In July 2019, he announced his return to recording and performing.

Discography

Albums
Apologia CD (Self Released) 2003
Celeste CD (Celebrate Psi Phenomenon) 2004, (Barl Fire Recordings) 2005 and (Tompkins Square) 2008
Lost Prayers and Motionless Dances CD (Digitalis Industries) 2004 and (Tompkins Square) 2008
Sunshrine CD (Digitalis Industries) 2005 and (Tompkins Square) 2008
O True Believers LP (Bo'weavil Records) & CD (Important Records) 2006
Waking Into Sleep - Goteburg 27.05.06 Live recording, CD (Kning Disk) 2006
The Cloud of Unknowing CD/LP (Tompkins Square) 2007
Litany of Echoes CD (Tompkins Square) 2008
The Glass Bead Game CD (Young God Records) 2009
All is Falling CD/LP (Young God Records) 2010
Holly EP LP (Important Records) 2011
Love is the Plan, the Plan is Death LP (Important Records) 2012
Fantomas: Le Faux Magistrat OST CD/2LP (Tompkins Square) 2014
Summoning Suns CD/LP (Important Records/P-Vine) 2015

Compilations, collaborations, split releases and guest appearances
Davenport Vs. James Blackshaw CD-R with Davenport (Static Records) 2005
Gold Leaf Branches 3xCD (Digitalis Industries) 2005
Sunshrine / Celeste LP (Bo'Weavil Recordings) 2005
Imaginational Anthem Vol. 2 CD (Tompkins Square) 2006
A Raga For Peter Walker CD (Tompkins Square) 2006
The Garden of Forking Paths - a compilation CD curated and featuring music by James Blackshaw, Chieko Mori, Jozef van Wissem and Helena Espvall.  Artwork by Hanna Tuulikki CD (Important Records) 2008
Brethren of the Free Spirit (duo with Jozef van Wissem) - All Things Are From Him, Through Him and In Him CD/LP (audioMER) 2008
Brethren of the Free Spirit - The Wolf Also Shall Dwell With The Lamb CD/LP (Important) 2009
Current 93 - Aleph at Hallucinatory Mountain CD (Durtro/Jnana) 2009
Sailors With Wax Wings - Sailors With Wax Wings CD 2010
Myrninerest - “JHONN,” UTTERED BABYLON CD 2012
The Watchers (with Lubomyr Melnyk) CD/LP (Important Records) 2013

References

External links
jamesblackshaw.tumblr.com

James Blackshaw at Young God Records
James Black Shaw website

1981 births
Living people
English folk guitarists
English male guitarists
Important Records artists
Young God Records artists
21st-century British guitarists
21st-century British male musicians